Carmelita Viridiana Correa Silva (born 5 December 1988) is a Mexican track and field athlete who competes in the pole vault. She is the Mexican record holder with her best of 4.18 metres and was the gold medallist at the Central American and Caribbean Championships in Athletics in 2013.

Born in Tonalá, Chiapas, she won her first international medal as a junior athlete, placing second at the 2006 Central American and Caribbean Junior Championships. She followed this with eighth place at the 2007 Pan American Junior Athletics Championships. In her first year of competing as a senior in 2008 she set a best of 3.95 metres and placed fourth at the 2008 NACAC Under-23 Championships in Athletics, held in Toluca. A Mexican record vault of 4.18 m came at the Olimpiada Nacional.

She made her senior international debut in 2011 and placed fifth at the 2011 Central American and Caribbean Championships in Athletics and tenth at the Pan American Games in Guadalajara. An appearance at the 2012 Ibero-American Championships in Athletics saw her finish seventh. She won her first major medal in her native Mexico at the 2013 Central American and Caribbean Championships in Athletics with a gold medal-winning vault of 3.95 m.

Personal best

Achievements

References

External links

Living people
1988 births
Mexican female pole vaulters
Sportspeople from Chiapas
Athletes (track and field) at the 2011 Pan American Games
Pan American Games competitors for Mexico
People from Tonalá, Chiapas
21st-century Mexican women